Rugged individualism, derived from individualism, is a term that indicates that an individual is self-reliant and independent from outside, usually state or government assistance. While the term is often associated with the notion of laissez-faire and associated adherents, it was actually coined by United States president Herbert Hoover.

History 
American rugged individualism has its origins in the American frontier experience. Throughout its evolution, the American frontier was generally sparsely populated and had very little infrastructure in place. Under such conditions, individuals had to provide for themselves to survive. This kind of environment forced people to work in isolation from the larger community and may have altered attitudes at the frontier in favor of individualistic thought over collectivism.

Through the mid-twentieth century, the concept was championed by Hoover's former Secretary of the Interior and long-time president of Stanford University, Ray Lyman Wilbur, who wrote: "It is common talk that every individual is entitled to economic security. The only animals and birds I know that have economic security are those that have been domesticated—and the economic security they have is controlled by the barbed-wire fence, the butcher's knife and the desire of others. They are milked, skinned, egged or eaten up by their protectors."

Martin Luther King Jr. notably remarked on the term in his speech "The Other America" on March 10, 1968: "This country has socialism for the rich, rugged individualism for the poor."

Influence on contemporary America 
The ideal of rugged individualism continues to be a part of American thought. In 2016, a poll by Pew Research found that 57% of Americans did not believe that success in life was determined by forces outside of their control. Additionally, the same poll found that 58% of Americans valued a non-interventionist government over one that actively worked to further the needs of society.

Academics interviewed in the 2020 book Rugged Individualism and the Misunderstanding of American Inequality, co-written by Noam Chomsky, largely found that the continued belief in this brand of individualism is a strong factor in American policies surrounding social spending and welfare. Americans who more strongly believe in the values espoused by rugged individualism tend to view those who seek government assistance as being responsible for their position, leading to decreased support for welfare programs and increased support for stricter criteria for receiving government help. The influence of American individualistic thought extends to government regulation as well. Areas of the country which were part of the American frontier for longer, and were therefore more influenced by the frontier experience, were found to be more likely to be supportive of Republican candidates, who often vote against regulations such as gun control, minimum wage increases, and environmental regulation.

See also 
 Classical liberalism
 Conservatism in the United States
 Self-sufficiency

References 

American political catchphrases
Individualism